Crucial Conversations: Tools for Talking When Stakes Are High was first published in 2002 by McGraw-Hill, and a second edition was published in 2012. A business self-help book written by the four co-founders of VitalSmarts, Kerry Patterson, Joseph Grenny, Ron McMillan, and Al Switzler, the book has sold more than 2 million copies and has been translated into 28 languages.

Reception
Crucial Conversations was ranked by Business Insider as one of the most popular business books of 2013. In conjunction with the book, the authors offer training on how to hold more effective conversations.

References

2002 non-fiction books
Self-help books
McGraw-Hill books